Chole bhature is a food dish popular in the Northern areas of the Indian subcontinent. It is a combination of chana masala (spicy white chickpeas) and bhatura/puri, a deep-fried bread made from maida. 

Chole bhature is often eaten as a breakfast dish, sometimes accompanied with lassi. It can also be street food or a complete meal and may be accompanied with onions, pickled carrots, green chutney or achaar.

Origin 
There is debate over the place of origin for chole bhature. Some sources claim the dish to have originated in Delhi, where it is very popular. Others claim eastern Uttar Pradesh to be the place of origin.

Preparation 
Chole is prepared by cooking chickpeas and adding spices such as cumin, coriander seeds, turmeric powder, and chili powder. Onion, garlic, and ginger are also added for additional flavor. Bhature is prepared by combining flour, salt, and oil, and kneading the dough. The dough is rolled out into circles and deep-fried until the bhature puff up.

References

Indian cuisine
Indian fast food
Indian wheat dishes
Legume dishes
Nepalese cuisine
Pakistani cuisine
Punjabi cuisine
Chickpea dishes
Bengali cuisine
Bangladeshi cuisine
Uttar Pradeshi cuisine